Down the Line: Rarities is a 2009 compilation album of American singer–songwriter and rock and roll pioneer Buddy Holly's alternate takes and demos. It includes the original undubbed "garage tapes" with The Crickets and the "Apartment Tapes", which were recorded in the months before his death. Along with Memorial Collection, this album was released a week prior to the 50th anniversary of Holly's death (February 3, 1959) on January 27, 2009.

The compilation album chronicles Holly's journey from a 13-year-old novice (the album features his very first recording, a cover of Hank Snow's "My Two-Timin' Woman") in Lubbock, Texas through to his early recordings with The Crickets and unsuccessful contract with Decca Records to his recordings in New York after signing with Coral Records.

Track listing

Reception

In an interview with the Lubbock Avalanche-Journal, Holly's eldest brother Larry Holley commented before hearing both this album and the Memorial Collection, "María [Elena Holly] told me I was definitely going to just break down and cry when I hear all these CDs, because they've cleaned them (the songs) all up and Buddy's music never has come across so pure before."

Release details

References

External links

Buddy Holly - Geffen - Buddy Holly's artist page at the Geffen label website

Buddy Holly compilation albums
2009 compilation albums
Albums produced by Norman Petty
Compilation albums published posthumously